Football Club Pyunik Yerevan, commonly known as Pyunik ("Phoenix"), is an Armenian professional sports club based in the Kentron neighbourhood of Yerevan. Pyunik is mostly known for its professional football team which, since its creation in 1992, has always played in the Armenian Premier League, becoming the most successful team of Armenia in number of official titles, with 31 won to date.

Internationally, Pyunik has yet to win an international title, with the closest result being a bronze place finish in the 2006 Commonwealth of Independent States Cup. Pyunik's domestic success usually qualifies the team for UEFA Champions League and UEFA Europa League qualifying rounds. Pyunik is also known to be one of the most popular football clubs in Armenia, along with Urartu, Shirak and Ararat.

Pyunik has always had a fierce rivalry with Ararat, as both clubs are considered to be the most successful clubs in Armenia, the latter due to its Soviet accomplishments. Both clubs are also the two most popular in the country and favorites within the Armenian Diaspora. Pyunik also shares a rivalry with Urartu which began when Urartu relocated from Abovyan to Yerevan in 2001, and became the third largest team in the city. The Pyunik-Urartu rivalry is seen as one of the biggest clashes in Armenian football.

Pyunik's home stadium is the Vazgen Sargsyan Republican Stadium, which is also home to the Armenia national football team. The youth academy has produced many Armenian internationals such as Henrikh Mkhitaryan, Robert Arzumanyan, Karlen Mkrtchyan, Edgar Manucharyan, Varazdat Haroyan and Gevorg Ghazaryan, many who have played or are playing for top European clubs.

History
Pyunik was founded in 1992 by Armenian football legend Khoren Oganesian and originally named Homenetmen Yerevan. The club won the first Armenian Premier League competition held in 1992 which it shared with Shirak since both teams were tied on points. In 1995, Homenetmen Yerevan was renamed FC Pyunik (Armenian for "Phoenix"). Following the change of name, Pyunik went on to win the 1995–96 Armenian Premier League and end the season with a 59-match unbeaten streak.

In 1996, Pyunik played its first international cup match, a UEFA Europa League qualifying match against Finnish club HJK Helsinki which Pyunik won 3–1. Pyunik also won the 1996-97 Armenian Premier League securing itself another chance at qualifying for an international cup playoffs the following year.

In 1997, Pyunik played its first UEFA Champions League qualifying match against Hungarian side MTK Budapest FC yet failed to qualify for the playoffs following a 6–3 defeat on aggregate.

1998 proved to be a crucial year for the club following the loss of its main source of funding and the subsequent departure of its main players. Pyunik finished 6th that season and withdrew from football altogether.

Pyunik secured a comeback to professional football following its absorption of FC Armenicum, a newly promoted team to the Armenian Premier League. The club's new management sought to bring more experience to the club and reinforced the squad with foreign players from Argentina, Cameroon, Mali and Romania. The reinforcements brought positive results and Pyunik went on to win the 2001 Armenian Premier League and 2002 Armenian Cup.

2002 saw Pyunik advance to the second round of the UEFA Champions League qualifying round after beating Finnish champions Tampere United 6–0 on aggregate. From 2002 forwards, Pyunik went on to win the Armenian Premier League a record of 10 times in a row, from 2001 to 2010.

On 8 January 2020, former Armenian international goalkeeper Roman Berezovsky was announced as the club's new manager. Just over 7-months later, 13 July 2020, Berezovsky left the club by mutual consent. On 20 July 2020, Artak Oseyan was announced as Pyunik's new manager, but left his role as head coach on 13 December 2020. On 7 January 2021, Yegishe Melikyan was announced as Pyunik's new manager.

In the 2022/23 season, after victories over Cluj and Dudelange, Pyunik became the first ever Armenian club to reach the third round of Champions League qualifying, where they played against former European Champions Crvena Zvezda, losing 7-0 on aggregate. 

Subsequently, Pyunik dropped into the play-off round of the Europa League, where they played against the Moldovan side Sheriff Tiraspol. After two scoreless draws, Pyunik lost on penalties, thus dropping into the group stages of the Conference League, the first ever group stage appearance in a European competition for the club.

After a defeat away against Basel on the first matchday, Pyunik faced Slovan Bratislava in their first home match in Yerevan, which they won thanks to goals from Artak Dashyan and Yusuf Otubanjo. This result meant that they became the first ever Armenian team to win a game in UEFA group stage competitions.

Domestic history

Due to the 1995 season being a transitional season, there was no official winner of championship.
Championship was decided by a decision game.

European history

Kit and badge
Throughout the seasons, Pyunik has predominantly worn blue and white jerseys, with a few exceptions including Pyunik's first jerseys which were orange and

Puma is the club's current kit supplier since 2019.

On 3 August 2020, Pyunik announced that Joma would be supplying the team's kit for the 2020–21 season.

Kit suppliers and shirt sponsors

Badge
The club has had five different designs for its badge during its history, with the first three designs being significantly different from each other. 
Following the club's reappearance in 2001, Pyunik introduced its iconic logo design which included a bold letter P placed on top of a football. The club kept this design for 13 years before introducing a double-headed golden phoenix crest in 2014. This change resulted unpopular among the fans and Pyunik introduced a new badge in 2019, this time returning to its original round shape with a predominantly blue logo and a red phoenix in the center.

Stadium

Pyunik used several locations throughout its history. Between 1992 and 1998, Pyunik played at Hrazdan Stadium, Armenia's largest stadium with a capacity for 54,208 spectators.

In 2001, following the renovations works done at the Republican Stadium two years before, Pyunik relocated and played all its home matches there until 2013, with a brief interruption in 2008, when the club was forced to play at Pyunik Stadium; its training ground, due to renovation works at the Republican Stadium.

Between 2013 and 2017, the Yerevan Football Academy served as a home venue for all domestic competitions, while still using the Republican Stadium for international fixtures.
At the beginning of 2017–18 Armenian Premier League season, Pyunik used the Republican Stadium as a home venue during the first half of the season, and eventually returning to their own Pyunik Stadium during the second half.

The Republican Stadium is also the home of the Armenia national football team, and is sometimes used by other Armenian teams for their international cup fixtures.

The club is currently planning on building an all-seater 5,000 capacity stadium by 2022.

List of stadiums used by the club
 Hrazdan Stadium: 1992–98
 Vazgen Sargsyan Republican Stadium: 2001–08 
 Pyunik Stadium: 2008
 Vazgen Sargsyan Republican Stadium: 2008–13
 Yerevan Football Academy: 2013–17
 Vazgen Sargsyan Republican Stadium/Pyunik Stadium: 2017–18
 Vazgen Sargsyan Republican Stadium: 2018–present

Supporters

Pyunik's supporter base is traditionally regarded as part of Yerevan's higher class, in contrast with the supposedly more lower-class base of cross-town arch rival FC Urartu. Because of the club's history and recent success, the fanbase has grown not only in Yerevan, but in other provinces of Armenia and within the Armenian Diaspora as well.

Pyunik is considered to be one of the most popular clubs in Armenia, and has one of the biggest Ultras fanbases in Armenia, called Sector 18, named after the sector they occupy at the Vazgen Sargsyan Republican Stadium.

Rivalries
Pyunik's rivalry with Ararat originates with the creation of the club itself. Pyunik's founder Khoren Oganesian, is considered an Ararat club idol, due to his achievements at the club during the Soviet period, winning the 1975 Soviet Cup. Pyunik's success in recent history has led the club's image to surpass that of Ararat, which has led to arguments over which club has had a bigger impact on Armenian football.

The other rivalry, between Pyunik and Urartu is also known as the clash of Yerevan neighborhoods, since Pyunik is located in the wealthier Kentron neighborhood, whereas Urartu is located in the lower-class Malatia-Sebastia neighborhood. The rivalry between both teams originates from Urartu's relocation from Abovyan to Yerevan in 2001, competing with and eventually becoming one of the largest teams in the city. Both teams' youth academies also compete with each other as they are considered to be two of the best in the country.

Players

Current squad

Out on loan

Technical staff

Institutional

Executive board 
Arthur Soghomonyan is the current owner and President of Pyunik since 2017.

 Vice-president: Robert Gasparyan
 2nd Vice-president: Aleksandr Tarkhanov
 Executive Director: Tigran Martirosyan

Staff 
 Development: Aleksandr Tarkhanov
 Youth Academy: Albert Sargsyan
 Sporting director: Samvel Arustamyan
 Chief scout: Robert Arzumanyan
 Press Secretary: Shushanik Hakobyan
 Marketing and Public Relations: Vera Martirosyan
 Officer: Vardan Tsaturyan

Honours
Armenian Premier League
Champions (15): 1992, 1995–96, 1996–97, 2001, 2002, 2003, 2004, 2005, 2006, 2007, 2008, 2009, 2010, 2014–15, 2021–22 (record)
Runners-up (1): 2018–19

Armenian Cup
Winners (8): 1995–96, 2002, 2004, 2009, 2010, 2012–13, 2013–14, 2014–15 (record)
Runners-up (3): 1996–97 2006, 2016–17

Armenian Super Cup
Winners (9): 1998, 2002, 2004, 2005, 2007, 2008, 2010, 2011, 2015 (record)
Runners-up (6): 1996, 2003, 2006, 2009, 2013, 2014

Other sports sections

Football reserves and academy
The reserve is currently coached by Yuri Tarkhanov and competes in the Armenian First League. The youth academy is managed by Albert Sargsyan.

Notable players from the youth academy include Henrikh Mkhitaryan, Robert Arzumanyan, Karlen Mkrtchyan, Edgar Manucharyan, Varazdat Haroyan and Gevorg Ghazaryan.

References

External links

 

 
Football clubs in Armenia
Association football clubs established in 1992
Football clubs in Yerevan
1992 establishments in Armenia